Eigamoiya (18??-1915) was a queen consort of Nauru, and the aunt of King Aweida. King Aweiyida was the son of Chief Jim, the latter being the son of a warrior named Aweui of the Eoaru tribe.

Eigamoiya and Jim shared the same father but different mothers.  Eigamoiya's mother was a truly respected queen of Nauru; her name was Eomien. She was also named Iquen (for Queen) by early visitors.

1830s births
1915 deaths
Nauruan royalty
People from Boe District
Queens consort
19th-century Nauruan people